A cuisine is a specific set of cooking traditions and practices, often associated with a specific culture or region. Each cuisine involves food preparation in a particular style, of food and drink of particular types, to produce individually consumed items or distinct meals. A cuisine is frequently named after the region or place where it originated.  A cuisine is primarily influenced by the ingredients that are available locally or through trade. Religious food laws can also exercise a strong influence on such culinary practices.

Regional and ethnic cuisines 
Global cuisine is a cuisine that is practiced around the world. A cuisine is a characteristic style of cooking practices and traditions, often associated with a specific region, country or culture. To become a global cuisine, a local, regional or national cuisine must spread around the world with its food served worldwide.

Regional cuisine is based upon national, state or local regions. Regional cuisines may vary based upon food availability and trade, varying climates, cooking traditions and practices, and cultural differences. One noteworthy definition is based upon traditional cuisine: "A traditional cuisine is a coherent tradition of food preparation that rises from the daily lives and kitchens of a people over an extended period in a specific region of a country, or a specific country, and which, when localized, has notable distinctions from the cuisine of the country as a whole."

African cuisine

Central African cuisine

East African cuisine

North African cuisine

Southern African cuisine

West African cuisine

Cuisine of the Americas 

 Latin American cuisine
 Native American cuisine
 Inuit cuisine
 Tlingit cuisine

North American cuisine

American cuisine

Central American cuisine

South American cuisine

Caribbean cuisine

Asian cuisine

Central Asian cuisine

East Asian cuisine

Chinese cuisine

South Asian cuisine

Indian cuisine

Pakistani cuisine

Southeast Asian cuisine

Indonesian cuisine

West Asian cuisine

European cuisine

Central European cuisine

German cuisine

Eastern European cuisine

Northern European cuisine

Southern European cuisine

Western European cuisine

Oceanic cuisine

Cuisine styles

 Fast food
 Fusion cuisine
 Haute cuisine
 Molecular gastronomy
 Note by Note cuisine
 Nouvelle cuisine
 Vegan cuisine
 Vegetarian cuisine 
 Indian vegetarian cuisine

Religious cuisines

Historical cuisines

References

External links

 

Cuisines